Toki Air, officially , is a Japanese low-cost, regional airline based at Niigata Airport. It was founded on July 29, 2020 and is expected to commence operations in March 2023.

History 
Toki Air was established in July 29, 2020 in order to reconnect regional and remote areas across the country. The company signed a leasing agreement with Nordic Aviation Capital (NAC) for two ATR 72-600s. Additionally, the company also signed a ten-year Global Maintenance Agreement (GMA) with ATR for its two ordered 72-600s. Toki Air also plans to introduce the ATR 42-600S variant which is currently under development by ATR. Toki Air, is expected to have its first ATR 42-600S in early 2025. The purchase of the aircraft will make the company the first Japanese airline to operate this type of aircraft.

Toki Air took delivery of its first ATR 72 on October 10, 2022. The aircraft arrived at its hub at Niigata Airport on November 5, 2022.

The government of Niigata Prefecture extended 1.16 billion yen in financing to Toki on October 31, 2022.

Toki formally applied for an air operator's certificate on November 30, 2022. If approved, Toki would be the first new locally-owned Japanese domestic airline in 14 years (after Fuji Dream Airlines).

Destinations 
Toki Air plans to serve these destinations after its launch in 2023.。

Fleet

Current Fleet
The Toki Air fleet consists of the following aircraft (as of October 2022):

Toki Air is one of several airlines advising Heart Aerospace on its proposed ES-30 electric airliner.

References

External links 
 

Regional airlines of Japan
Japan
Companies based in Niigata Prefecture